South Korea's Ministry of Foreign Affairs (MOFA) is in charge of the country's foreign relations, as well as handling matters related to overseas Korean nationals. It was established on 17 July 1948.

Its main office is located in the MOFA Building in Jongno District, Seoul. The ministry previously had its headquarters in a facility in Doryeom-dong in Jongno District.

History
The Ministry of Foreign Affairs was created in 1948 following the Government Organisation Law under the Rhee Syng-man administration. It undertook matters of foreign policy, protection of overseas Korean nationals, international economy, treaties, diplomacy and the assessment of international and overseas public relations. The top priority for the Ministry was initially to focus on the “international recognition of the new Korean government as the only legitimate one on the Korean peninsula”. Shortly after the Ministry was established, overseas missions in the United States, the United Kingdom and France were set up. 

In 1963 the Educational Institute of Foreign Service Officers was established to further educate foreign public officials and improve their work efficiency. In 1965 the Educational institute became the Research Institute of Foreign Affairs. In December, 1976 the Research Institute was reorganised again to become the Institute for Foreign Affairs and Security. In 2012, this institution developed into the Korea National Diplomatic Academy and has the largest research and training institution of its kind within South Korea. 

In 1998, the ministry's name was changed to Ministry of Foreign Affairs and Trade (MOFAT, 외교통상부), and it was given jurisdiction over external trade. In 2013, it reverted to its earlier name of the Ministry of Foreign Affairs following Park Geun-hye’s reorganisation plan, and the responsibility for trade matters was handed over to the Ministry of Knowledge Economy, which was renamed the Ministry of Trade, Industry and Energy.

Organisation
The minister is supported by two vice-ministers, vice-ministerial-level chancellor of Korea National Diplomatic Academy and Special Representative for Korean Peninsula Peace and Security Affairs.

List of ministers

Key diplomatic tasks
The Ministry of Foreign Affairs engages in a number of diplomatic tasks that primarily aim to build international relationships, promote peace and protect the Republic of Korea and Korean nationals. According to the ministry website, these tasks aim to fulfil the national vision of a ‘nation of the people, a just Republic of Korea’. They are summarised below as follows: 

 Peaceful resolution of the North Korean nuclear issue and the establishment of a peace regime on the Korean Peninsula

Diplomatically achieve complete denuclearisation and build a ‘permanent and solid peace regime on the Korean Peninsula’.

 Promotion of national interest through public and participatory diplomacy

Increase understanding and support of the Republic of Korea and its foreign policy through ‘strategic public diplomacy’ and encouraging public participation and communication.

 Pursuing assertive cooperative diplomacy with neighbouring countries

Proactively and assertively strengthen cooperation with China, Japan and Russia with the ‘alliance between the Republic of Korea and the United States of America playing a central role’. As a gateway to tackling the North Korean nuclear issue and Eurasian diplomatic relations, the strengthening of these relationships aims to create a foundation for permanent peace on the Korean Peninsula.

 Establishment of a Northeast Asia+ Community of Responsibility

Establish the Northeast Asia Peace and Cooperation Platform and pursue its New Northern Policy and New Southern Policy with the aim of building a ‘peaceful and cooperative environment conducive to the long-term prosperity and survival of the Republic of Korea’.

 Strengthening economic diplomacy and development cooperation to promote national interest

Create an international economic environment, increase engagement with emerging market countries and actively respond to climate change. Cooperatively increase contributions to the international community enhance national interest.

 Strengthening the protection of Korean nationals traveling abroad and expanding support of overseas Koreans

Systemically protect and increase the benefits of Korean nationals residing abroad and ‘vitalize the Korean global network’ through strengthening their capacity.

2021 P4G Seoul Summit
The South Korean MoFA (Ministry of Foreign Affairs) is involved in creating environmental policies and working with countries around the world to achieve sustainable development goals (SDGs). As such they are hosting the P4G Seoul Summit in late May 2021. The event will be done online due to the COVID-19 crisis, and will look into improving the current climate change situation. The summit will look into improving the global public-private cooperation. The foreign minister Chung Eui-yong is particularly involved in this initiative as this has a significant impact on the relationship between the ROK and other countries such as the US and Denmark. 

June 2015 saw South Korea publish its Nationally Determined Contribution (NDC), an initiative by which countries focus on improving their environmental goals. The country set the aim of lowering emissions by 37% by 2030. As well as this, South Korea has participated in many initiatives to lower their carbon footprint such as the COP21 in Paris, ratifying the document in December 2015. Korea has taken a ‘green growth’ approach to climate change but despite these efforts there was actually an increase in coal usage over the past decade. Predictions have shown that Korea is not likely to reach the set targets. The MoFA, however, has been in close contact with Denmark to work together on their Green Growth Alliance (2011) in an attempt to make the P4G Seoul Summit a success.

See also

 MOFAT Diamond scandal

References

External links
 Ministry of Foreign Affairs
 Ministry of Foreign Affairs (English)

1948 establishments in Korea
South Korea
Foreign relations of South Korea
Foreign Affairs
Jongno District
South Korea, Foreign Affairs